Peter Černák (born 21 January 1976) is a former Slovak football player and the current manager of Žilina. He served as an assistant to Pavol Staňo in Žilina. He replaced Pavol Staňo as manager on 4 October 2021.

He played for Spartak Trnava, ViOn Zlaté Moravce and Slovan Bratislava in the Slovak top division and Dynamo České Budějovice in the Czech Gambrinus liga.

References

1976 births
Living people
People from Handlová
Sportspeople from the Trenčín Region
Association football midfielders
Slovak footballers
Slovak football managers
ŠK Slovan Bratislava players
SK Dynamo České Budějovice players
FC ViOn Zlaté Moravce players
FC Spartak Trnava players
FC Baník Prievidza players
Slovak Super Liga players
Czech First League players
FK Pohronie managers
FC Baník Prievidza managers
2. Liga (Slovakia) managers
4. Liga (Slovakia) managers
3. Liga (Slovakia) managers
Expatriate footballers in the Czech Republic
Slovak expatriate sportspeople in the Czech Republic